Wester Kames Castle is located near Kames Bay near Port Bannatyne, Isle of Bute, Scotland. Dating from around 1700, the castle was rebuilt around 1900 from a ruined state.

History
The tower house of Wester Kames dates from around 1700, and was once the seat of the Spense family. By 1895 it formed part of the Marquess of Bute's estate, and only the ground floor was standing.  The 3rd Marquess of Bute commissioned the architect Robert Weir Schultz to rebuild the tower in 1897. The junction of the original ruin and the 19th-century rebuilding is marked by a line of brickwork. Schultz' attention to detail delivered in a sympathetic restoration, resulting in a "convincing Baronial tower".  

The tower measure . It stands four storeys high, with a five-storey stair tower at the north-west. Wester Kames is a Category A listed building.

See also

References

Category A listed buildings in Argyll and Bute
Listed castles in Scotland
Isle of Bute